John Plantagenet may refer to any John who was a descendant of Geoffrey Plantagenet, Count of Anjou:    
 John, King of England
 John of Lancaster, 1st Duke of Bedford
 John, 3rd Earl of Kent